The Vanity Set is an indie rock group of mostly second-generation Greek-Americans formed in New York City in 2000. Led by Jim Sclavunos, the drummer/percussionist with Nick Cave and the Bad Seeds, they describe their music as a blend of "low art, high sass and raw bluster." Their music includes the sounds of rebetiko, "psycho-billy guitar, creepy keys, raucous tuba, mellifluous theremin."

Current members
 Jim Sclavunos - lead vocals
 Peter Mavrogeorgis - guitar, bouzouki
 David Morton - keyboards, clarinet
 Tam Ui - drums
 Sasha Kazachkov - bass
 Jennifer Carey - tuba & dead-bird-in-bag wrangler
 Jaiko Suzuki - percussion

Previous members
 Meredith Yayanos - violin, theremin
 David Berger - drums, percussion
 David Clifford -(Drums)
 Brian Emrich - (Bass, Synthesizer, ondioline)

Discography
The Vanity Set
Little Stabs of Happiness
The Big Bang 7" record

References

External links
Official Site
Article in The Guardian 

Indie rock musical groups from New York (state)
Greek-American culture in New York City
Musical groups established in 2000